The Singkil Barat Nature Reserve is a  nature reserve found on the island of Sumatra, Indonesia.

In this park you can meet a Sumatran tiger.

References

Protected areas of Sumatra
Geography of North Sumatra